Korean Uruguayans, numbering 130 individuals, formed the 19th-largest Korean community in Latin America as of 2005, according to the statistics of South Korea's Ministry of Foreign Affairs and Trade.

Migration history
The first Korean immigrants to Uruguay were ten families, totalling 45 persons, admitted in March 1975 to work in the agricultural sector. However, most of them later emigrated to Argentina and Paraguay. Since 1980, a total of 140 Koreans have naturalised as Uruguayan citizens, although many are not resident in the country any longer. The population is transient and fluctuates in size; the peak months of Korean presence in Uruguay are June, July, November and December.

Employment
Most Koreans live in and around Montevideo, where some work as fishermen, while others are involved in the textile industry. The fishermen are almost all from Busan; they earn between US$1,000 and US$1,500 a month, while the engineers on their boats receive US$3,000-4,000 and the captain may make as much as US$6,000. The fishermen often work in dangerous conditions and face language barriers. In February 2007, three Korean fishermen were killed in an explosion on board a fishing boat, along with their Vietnamese colleague. There are several Korean-run restaurants and noraebang (karaoke bars) in Montevideo. 
As of 2013, there are 15 South Korean citizens registered in the Uruguayan social security.

Religion
South Korean missionaries of the Church of the Brethren, a Protestant denomination, have been evangelising among Korean fishermen in Uruguay for almost 20 years. One of their earliest converts from among the fishermen, Simon Lee, eventually left the fishing industry to devote himself to religious work; in 2004, he and ten others established a Korean church in Montevideo, which also aimed to serve fishermen from other Asian countries as well.

Notable people
Giovanna Yun (18 July 1992), a female footballer who plays for Uruguayan club Peñarol and the Uruguay national team. She has South Korean heritage from her father's side.

See also
South Korea-Uruguay relations

References

Asian Uruguayan
Ethnic groups in Uruguay
Korean Latin American
 
Uruguay
Immigration to Uruguay